Mollinedia stenophylla is a species of plant in the Monimiaceae family. It is endemic to Brazil.  It is threatened by habitat loss.

References

stenophylla
Endemic flora of Brazil
Endangered plants
Endangered biota of South America
Taxonomy articles created by Polbot